Stephen M. Colarelli is an American psychology professor at Central Michigan University, known for his research on evolutionary psychology and the workplace.

Biography

Stephen Colarelli is a professor of psychology at Central Michigan University. He was a visiting professor of management at the National University of Singapore and Hong Kong Baptist University, and a Fulbright Fellow at the University of Zambia. He earned a B.A. from Northwestern University, an M.A. from the University of Chicago, and a Ph.D. in psychology from New York University. He served a Peace Corps volunteer in Senegal from 1973 to 1975.

Colarelli's major area of interest is the application of evolutionary psychology to the world of work.

References 
Colarelli, S. M. & Arvey, R.A. (Eds.) (2015). Biological Foundations of Organizational Behavior. Chicago: University of Chicago Press.

Colarelli, S. M. (2003).  No best way: An evolutionary perspective on human resource management.  Greenwich, CT: Praeger.

External links 
 http://www.chsbs.cmich.edu/stephen_colarelli/

21st-century American psychologists
Year of birth missing (living people)
Living people